Coats of arms of U.S. Support Battalions are heraldic emblems associated with units in the US Army. By Army regulation, all regiments, and some other units, of the US Army organized under a table of organization and equipment are authorized a coat of arms to be displayed on the organization's standard, called the "colors." This coat of arms usually forms the basis for the unit's distinctive unit insignia (DUI), the emblem worn by all members of the unit on their service uniforms.

Below are galleries of the coats of arms of aviation support battalions (ASBs), combat sustainment support battalions (CSSBs) and brigade support battalions (BSBs).

1 to 99

100 to 299

300 to 499

500 on

Sources & references

 Support unit Distinctive Unit Insignia, Shoulder Sleeve Insignia, Coat of Arms

See also

 Coats of arms of U.S. Army units
 Brigade insignia of the United States Army
 Division insignia of the United States Army

Support battalions of the United States Army
United States military coats of arms
Support Battalions